Locust Manor is a station on the Long Island Rail Road's Atlantic Branch in the Locust Manor neighborhood of Queens, New York City. The station is located at Farmers Boulevard and Bedell Street and is 14.0 miles (22.5 km) from Penn Station in Midtown Manhattan. The stop serves the Rochdale, Queens section and its Rochdale Village apartment complex, and was also the stop for the racecourse on which Rochdale Village was erected, Jamaica Race Course. Today it contains fiberglass populuxe designed shelters on high-level platforms.

On weekdays, the station is served by Far Rockaway Branch trains and Long Beach Branch trains bypass the station. This setup is reversed on weekends.

History 
In February 1956, the Long Island Rail Road (LIRR) petitioned the New York State Public Service Commission (PSC) for permission to close and remove the station if racing was transferred from Jamaica Race Course to Belmont Park due to low ridership. The station was used by 80 riders on weekdays, and by 30 riders on non-racing Saturdays. The LIRR suggested that riders use the Higbie Avenue station instead. On August 23, 1956, the PSC rejected plans to build a permanent railroad station alongside Jamaica Race Course, and approved a revised plan to close the Locust Manor station and a bridge at 120th Avenue, which would save $1,087,000. The PSC ruled that it was not justified for the LIRR to spend $847,000 on a new station in light of public knowledge about the closure of the racetrack in 1958. The LIRR's application was opposed by the counsel for the Mayor's Committee on Slum Removal, who stated that as soon as racing ended in 1958 at the track following the rebuilding of Belmont Racetrack, and the modernization of Aqueduct Racetrack, a builder would start work on the site.

Station layout

This station has two high-level side platforms, each eight cars long.

This station has two exits; one exit, adjacent to the Rochdale Village power house, is on the northeast portion of the sprawling Rochdale housing co-operative. At that end of the station, the staircase leads to a Bedell Street (southbound) walkway in between two private Rochdale parking lots, and to a northbound walkway leading to residential 134th Avenue. The southern exit leads to Farmers Boulevard, between Garrett and Bedell streets. There are short canopies near the exits. Ticket machines are at a pedestrian tunnel on the north (Rochdale Village) end of the station, at the base of the eastbound (Long Island-bound) LIRR station staircase.

References

External links 
 
 
 Farmers Boulevard entrance from Google Maps Street View
Platforms from Google Maps Street View

Long Island Rail Road stations in New York City
Railway stations in Queens, New York
Railway stations in the United States opened in 1869
1869 establishments in New York (state)